DYRT (99.5 FM), on-air as Barangay RT 99.5, is a radio station owned and operated by GMA Network Inc. The station's studio and transmitter are located at GMA Skyview Complex, Nivel Hills, Apas, Cebu City.

History

1978-1979: DYLS/DYRT
The station was established in 1978 on 97.1 MHz under the call letters DYLS. It was the second oldest regional FM station under the auspices of the Republic Broadcasting System after DXSS in Davao, which started operations in 1977. In 1979, the station went off the air. The frequency returned on air in 1992, this time under the ownership of AMCARA Broadcasting Network.

1980-1995: Double 9.5 RT
On February 4, 1980, the station returned to air, this time on 99.5 MHz under the call letters DYRT. It carried the branding Double 9.5 RT: The Romantic Touch, with the slogans "Cebu's Most Romantic Easy Listening Radio Station" and "The Beautiful Music Station of Cebu". Back then, its studio and transmitter were located at the 10/F Luym Bldg. along Plaridel cor. Juan Luna St. (now Osmeña Blvd.). The station aired easy listening music and news updates every top of the hour, and English was used as its medium. In 1990, DYRT and its sister station GMA-7 Cebu moved to its current home in GMA Skyview Complex in Nivel Hills, Apas, and switched to a Top 40 format.

1995-2014: Campus Radio/99.5 RT
On March 1, 1995, following the launch of RGMA done by Mike Enriquez, the station was rebranded as Campus Radio 99.5 RT, with the slogan "Forever!". Two years later, when Bobby Nalzaro took over the operations of GMA Cebu, the station changed its slogan to "Nindota-Ah!", which was later adapted by several RGMA FM stations in Mindanao in 1998, and changed its medium to Cebuano. The station was reformatted to a mass-based station. On July 29, 2002, the station dropped Campus Radio from its branding. From 2013 to 2018, as conducted by Nielsen Radio Audience Measurement, 99.5 RT Cebu was the dominant overall Number 1 Radio Station in Cebu.

2014-present: Barangay RT
On February 17, 2014, as part of RGMA's brand unifying, the station was rebranded as Barangay RT 99.5 and carried-over the slogan "Isang Bansa, Isang Barangay". Since then, it began simulcasting a handful of programs from its Manila station. On April 22, 2019, the station began simulcasting DYSS Super Radyo's program Bobby Nalzaro On Board: Saksi (now On Board: Saksi).

Following the effects of Typhoon Rai (Odette) in Cebu, Bohol and Leyte on December 16, 2021, the station scaled down its programming.

References

External links

www.amfmph.com/barangay-99-5-rt-cebu-11254.html

Barangay FM stations
Barangay RT 99.5
Radio stations established in 1978